The Star Cavalier was an American two-seat high-wing light aircraft first introduced in the late 1920s.

Development

The Star Aircraft division of Phillips Petroleum was formed at Bartlesville, Oklahoma in 1928.  Designers E.A.Riggs and W.Parker prepared plans for a two-passenger high-wing light private owner aircraft intended for the lower cost end of the market.  The advertised cost was $3,450. Three Cavalier A planes were delivered in 1928.

The Cavalier B followed in 1929 fitted with a lower powered 55 hp Velie M-5 engine and 15 examples were sold at $2,895 to owners of more modest means. Single examples of the Cavalier C and D followed. The next to secure modest success was the Cavalier E of 1930 which had a 90 h.p. Lambert and was fitted with a taller, more angular, tail fin. 13 were sold. The last of the Cavalier series was the single F model.

Operational history
The various Cavalier models served private owners in the touring role until the curtailment of civil flying in the US in late 1941. Five Cavaliers remained on the U.S. civil aircraft register as of 2009. Cavalier B N14860 of 1930 is on public display, in airworthy condition, at the Historic Aircraft Restoration Museum at Dauster Field, Creve Coeur, Missouri near St Louis.

Variants

(source - Aerofiles)

Cavalier A 1928.  Lambert R-266 5 cylinder radial.
Cavalier B 1929/30.  Velie M-5. Some had an  Armstrong Siddeley Genet or  Lambert R-266.
Cavalier C 1929.  LeBlond 5D 5 cylinder radial.
Cavalier D 1929.  LeBlond.
Cavalier E 1930.  Lambert R-266 and taller more angular fin.
Cavalier F 1930. Warner Junior

Specifications (Cavalier B)

References

Citations

Bibliography

 Aerofiles - Cavalier

1920s United States civil utility aircraft
High-wing aircraft
Single-engined tractor aircraft